This page provides supplementary chemical data on barium oxide.

Material Safety Data Sheet  
SDS from Millipore Sigma

Structure and properties

Thermodynamic properties

Spectral data

References 

Chemical data pages
Chemical data pages cleanup